Runesson may refer to:

Albin Runesson (born 1996), Swedish ice hockey defenceman
Carin Runesson (born 1947), Swedish social democratic politician, member of the Riksdag since 2006
Eric M. Runesson (born 1960), Swedish lawyer, member of the Swedish Academy and Justice of the Supreme Court of Sweden
Johan Runesson (born 1990), Swedish orienteering competitor, World and Junior World Champion
Lotta Runesson, Swedish football midfielder

See also
Renison (disambiguation)
Ronson (disambiguation)